Chuang Chia-jung and Olga Govortsova were the defending champions, and lost to Daniela Hantuchová and Agnieszka Radwańska in the first round.

Květa Peschke and Katarina Srebotnik won this tournament by defeating Gisela Dulko and Flavia Pennetta in the final.

Seeds
The top four seeds received a bye into the second round.

Draw

Finals

Top half
{{16TeamBracket-Compact-Tennis3-Byes
| RD1=First round
| RD2=Second round
| RD3=Quarterfinals
| RD4=Semifinals

| RD1-seed03=WC
| RD1-team03= Ka Plíšková Kr Plíšková
| RD1-score03-1=6
| RD1-score03-2=6
| RD1-score03-3= 
| RD1-seed04=WC
| RD1-team04= M Kondratieva S Sun
| RD1-score04-1=3
| RD1-score04-2=3
| RD1-score04-3= 

| RD1-seed05= 
| RD1-team05=

Bottom half

References
 Main Draw

China Open - Doubles